Banda de Lucero is a village and municipality in Catamarca Province in northwestern Argentina, and is located in the Tinogasta Department.

References

Populated places in Catamarca Province